Józef Mitkowski (1911–1980) was a Polish historian. In 1969 he gained the title of professor.

Mitkowski collaborated with the Western Institute.

Publications 
 Pomorze Zachodnie w stosunku do Polski, Poznań: Wydawnictwo Instytutu Zachodniego 1946.
 Początki klasztoru cystersów w Sulejowie: studia nad dokumentami, fundacją i rozwojem uposażenia do końca XIII w., Poznań: nakł. Poznańskiego Towarzystwa Przyjaciół Nauk 1949.
 Śląsk w okresie formowania i utrwalania się państwa polskiego : do roku 1138, Opole: Instytut Śląski 1966.
 Kancelaria Kazimierza Konradowica, księcia kujawsko-łęczyckiego 1233-1267, Kraków: Zakład Narodowy im. Ossolińskich. Wydawnictwo PAN 1968.
 Bolesław Krzywousty, Warszawa: Wydawnictwa Szkolne i Pedagogiczne 1981.

References 
Jerzy Wyrozumski, Mitkowski Józef [in:] Słownik historyków polskich, ed. Maria Prosińskia-Jackl, Warszawa 1994, p. 355.
Marian Plezia, Wspomnienie o prof. Józefie Mitkowskim, „Tygodnik Powszechny” 34 (1980), No. 30, [. 4.
Stanisław Szczur, Józef Mitkowski (15 X 1911 - 15 VI 1980), „Studia Historyczne” 23 (1980), z. 4, p. 683-686.
Jerzy Wyrozumski, Instynkt historyka. O Józefie Mitkowskim (15 X 1911 - 15 VI 1980), „Życie Literackie” 31 (1981), No. 24, p. 11, 13.
Stanisław Szczur, Bibliografia prac prof. dra Józefa Mitkowskiego za lata 1938–1980, „Zeszyty Naukowe UJ” No. 663: Prace Historyczne, Z. 74, 1985, p. 9-19.

20th-century Polish historians
Polish male non-fiction writers
1911 births
1980 deaths
Recipient of the Meritorious Activist of Culture badge